Shaanxi (alternatively Shensi, see § Name) is a landlocked province of China. Officially part of Northwest China, it borders the province-level divisions of Shanxi (NE, E), Henan (E), Hubei (SE), Chongqing (S), Sichuan (SW), Gansu (W), Ningxia (NW) and Inner Mongolia (N).

Xi'an – which includes the sites of the former Chinese capitals Fenghao and Chang'an – is the provincial capital as well as the largest city in Northwest China and also one of the oldest cities in China and the oldest of the Four Great Ancient Capitals, being the capital for the Western Zhou, Western Han, Jin, Sui and Tang dynasties. Xianyang, which served as the Qin dynasty capital, is just north across Wei River. The other prefecture-level cities into which the province is divided are Ankang, Baoji, Hanzhong, Shangluo, Tongchuan, Weinan, Yan'an and Yulin.

The province is geographically divided into three parts, namely Northern, Central and Southern Shaanxi. Northern Shaanxi (or "Shaanbei") makes up the southeastern portion of the Ordos Basin and mainly comprises the two prefectural cities of Yulin and Yan'an on the northern Loess Plateau, demarcated from the Ordos Desert and the grasslands of Inner Mongolia's Ordos City by the Ming Great Wall.  Central Shaanxi (or "Shaanzhong") is also known as the Guanzhong region and comprises the drainage basin of lower Wei River east of Mount Long and north of the Qinling Mountains, where the majority of Shaanxi's population reside. Southern Shaanxi (or "Shaannan") comprises the three prefectural cities in the edge of the historical Bashu region south of the Qinling Mountains and includes the three mountainous cities of Hanzhong, Ankang and Shangluo.

Along with areas of adjacent Shanxi and Henan provinces, it formed the cradle of the Chinese civilization. In the Republican era of China, the city of Yan'an was near the endpoint of the Long March by the Chinese Red Army, who fled from Jiangxi after the Chinese Soviet Republic were destroyed by the Kuomintang armies, and became the birthplace of the Chinese Communist Revolution from late 1935 to early 1947 and the Communists formed the Shaan-Gan-Ning Border Region in constituent parts of Shaanxi.

The vast majority of the population of Shaanxi is Han Chinese (>99%), with Hui, Manchu and Mongol being the more significant ethnic minorities. Mandarin Chinese is the main spoken language in Shaanxi, including Zhongyuan Mandarin and Southwestern Mandarin dialects; another variety of Chinese, Jin Chinese, is also spoken in the regions neighboring Shanxi.

Shaanxi is China's 15th largest economy, ranking within the middle tier among China's administrative divisions. The fossil fuel and high technology sectors compose the two largest industries in Shaanxi Province. The high technology sector includes aircraft and aerospace industries and Shaanxi produces more than 50% of the R&D and manufacturing equipment for the country's domestic commercial aviation industry.

Name

The name of the province, means "Shan's West", referring to Shan plateau, now known as Zhanbian plateau. The usage "West from Shan" first appeared in a text circa 200 BC about how the Duke of Zhou divided feudal lands.

To avoid tone marks, the double "a" in "Shaan" was borrowed from the Gwoyeu Romatzyh scheme of 1928. This spelling trouble, however, would not have occurred for the more archaic Chinese languages native to the two provinces, which pronounce Shaanxi like "Shie-sei" and Shanxi like "San-sei".

In older texts, Shaanxi was written as Shensi, as early as 1748. "Shensi" was recognized in the 1906 Chinese postal romanization. "Shensi" continued to be popular alongside "Shaanxi" until 1987 when the PRC officially banned pre-PRC romanizations.

History
 Shaanxi is considered one of the cradles of Chinese civilization. Thirteen feudal dynasties established their capitals in the province during a span of more than 1,100 years, from the Zhou dynasty to the Tang dynasty.

The province's principal city and current capital, Xi'an, is one of the four great ancient capitals of China and is the eastern terminus of the Silk Road, which leads to Europe, the Arabian Peninsula and Africa.

Under the Han dynasty, the Northern Silk Road was expanded to advance exploration and military purposes to the west. It connected the ancient Chinese capital of Xi'an to the west over the Wushao Ling Pass to Wuwei and emerging in Kashgar before linking to ancient Parthia.

The Northern Song dynasty established a Shaanxi Lu, (circuit) in the area, governed from modern Xi'an in 997. The Yuan dynasty established Shaanxi Province (Yuan dynasty), governed by a Branch Secretariat in 1286.

Under the Ming dynasty, Shaanxi was established with the founding of the Saanxi Provincial Administration Commission in 1376, whose administration also included the modern provinces of Gansu, Ningxia, and part of Qinghai. In the Ming, most visitors from Central Asia and West Asia entered the country via Shaanxi.

One of the most devastating earthquakes in history occurred near Hua Shan, in south-eastern part of Shaanxi Province on January 23, 1556, killing an estimated 830,000 people (see 1556 Shaanxi earthquake).

After the founding of the Qing dynasty, Gansu was split from Shaanxi, but both provinces were governed under the Viceroy of Shaan-Gan.

The end of the short-lived Jiangxi Soviet signaled the beginning of the Long March by Mao Zedong and the Chinese Communists to the Shaanxi Soviet at Yan'an.

Pre-historic site
The Lantian Man site, with hominin fossils of one million years ago, was found in Lantian County in northwestern Shaanxi province, near the city of Xi'an. Scientists classify Lantian Man as a subspecies of Homo erectus. The fossils are displayed at the Shaanxi History Museum, Xi'an, China.

Geography

The geography of the area is described as being part of the Ordos Desert in the north along the border with Inner Mongolia, the Loess Plateau in the central part of the province, the Qin Mountains (Qinling) running east to west in the south central part, and subtropical climate south of the Qinling. In between the Loess Plateau and the Qinling lies the Wei River Valley, or Guanzhong, a cradle of early Chinese civilization.

Going clockwise, Shaanxi borders Shanxi (E, NE), Henan (E), Hubei (SE), Chongqing (S), Sichuan (SW), Gansu (W), Ningxia (NW), and Inner Mongolia (N). In terms of number of bordering provincial-level divisions, Shaanxi ties Inner Mongolia.

Due to its large span in latitude, Shaanxi has a variety of climates. Under the Köppen climate classification, the northern parts, including the Loess Plateau, have either a cold arid (Köppen BWk) or cold semi-arid (Köppen BSk), with cold and very dry winters, dry springs and autumns, and hot, humid summers. The area known as Guanzhong is mostly semi-arid, though there are a few areas with a humid subtropical climate (Köppen Cwa), with cool to cold winters, and hot, humid summers that often see early-season heatwaves. The southern portion is much more humid and lies in the humid subtropical zone, with more temperate winters and long, hot, humid summers.

Besides the provincial capital of Xi'an, other cities include: Baoji, Hanzhong, Lintong, Tongchuan, Xianyang, Yan'an and Ankang.

Administrative divisions

Shaanxi consists of ten prefecture-level divisions: all prefecture-level cities (including a sub-provincial city):

The ten prefecture-level cities of Shaanxi are subdivided into 107 county-level divisions (30 districts, 4 county-level cities, and 73 counties).

Urban areas

Politics 

The politics of Shaanxi is structured in a triple party-government system like all other governing institutions in mainland China.

The Governor of Shaanxi is the highest-ranking official in the People's Government of Shaanxi. However, in the province's dual party-government governing system, the Governor is considered to have less power than the Shaanxi Chinese Communist Party Provincial Committee Secretary, colloquially termed the "Shaanxi CCP Party Chief"; since the Governor is always ranked as the First-Deputy Secretary in the Shaanxi Chinese Communist Party Provincial Committee.

Shaanxi was established as a provincial government since Qing dynasty. On 10 January 1950, the People's Government of Shaanxi was established in Xi'an. Ma Minfang was then appointed as the first Governor of Shaanxi.

Economy

As of the mid-19th century, Shaanxi exported animal skins, wine, liquor, and musk. Money loans were also common, with Shaanxi business people involved in the Guangzhou loan business. Shaanxi commonly imported European animal skins, watches, Chinese language books, and cloth.

The fossil fuel and high technology sectors compose the two largest industries in Shaanxi province. During 2009, the province ranked third in China for production of coal, natural gas and crude oil. As the home of several of the leading universities and research institutes in Western China, Shaanxi province also plays a major role in China's burgeoning aircraft and aerospace industries, producing more than 50% of the R&D and manufacturing equipment for the country's domestic commercial air industry. Nominal GDP for 2011 was 1,239 billion RMB (US$196.7 billion) and GDP per capita was 21,729 RMB (US$3,179), ranking 17th in the PRC.

In the first half of 2019, Shaanxi's total production value reached 1,162.557 billion yuan, a year-on-year increase of 5.4%. The added value of the primary industry was 55.319 billion yuan, an increase of 4.5%; the second industry was 557.935 billion yuan, an increase of 4.2%; the tertiary industry was 549.303 billion yuan, an increase of 6.8%.

Economic and technological development zones

Baoji Hi-Tech Industrial Development Zone
Established in 1992, Baoji Hi-Tech Industrial Development Zone was approved as a national hi-tech zone by the State Council. The transportation system around the zone includes Xi'an-Xianyang International Airport and National Highway 310, and industries operating within the zone include auto parts, electronics, IT, pharmaceuticals and bioengineering industries and new materials.

Shaanxi Xi'an Export Processing Zone
Shaanxi Xi'an Export Processing Zone (XEPZ) was approved on 21 June 2002 by the State Council for its establishment and was put on 5 April 2004. As the first state-level export processing zone in northwest China, XEPZ has become one of the seven pioneer EPZs with the function of bonded logistics in China. XEPZ is under the leadership of the Administrative Committee of Xi'an Economic and Technological Development Zone (XETDZ), which is designated by Xi'an municipal government to exercise economic and administrative power within the zone. XEPZ is a special economic zone. By now, there are more than 40 enterprises home and abroad settled in XEPZ. The pillar industries feature aviation, machinery, electronics and new energy.

Western Triangle
The Western Triangle is a new economic zone composing the three major city-level economies of Western China: Xi'an, Chongqing and Chengdu. It is believed that the addition of Xi'an to the Triangle will spur economic growth in the region and allow the city an opportunity to capitalize on the commercial potential of its high-technology industries.

Xi'an Economic and Technological Development Zone
Established in 1993, Xi'an Economic and Technology Development Zone was approved as a national zone in 2000. The zone is 20 minutes from Xi'an Xianyang International Airport, and national highways pass through. It has formed four pillar industries: automotive, electronics, food, and new materials industries. So far, the zone has attracted more than 1,700 enterprises.

Xi'an High-tech Industrial Development Zone
Xi'an HTDZ opened its gates in 1991. It was established as a "pivotal location" for investment by high-tech industry companies in central and northwest China. Established in 1991, Xi'an Hi-Tech Industrial Development Zone is a national high-tech zone. It is surrounded by national highways and it is 30 minutes from Xi'an International Airport. Furthermore, it is ranked in the top three high-tech zones in China.

Xi'an Software Park
Xi'an Software Park, established in December 1998, is the professional park for Xi'an to develop scale software and service outsourcing industries. The park has been appraised as a software industry base under the National Torch Program, national software industry base, national software export base, city demonstrational area of national service outsourcing base. It is one of the four parks with "double bases" of software in China. Xi'an Software Park assembles 90% of enterprises engaging in software and service outsourcing in Xi'an. There were nearly 780 companies, of which foreign-funded enterprises account for 170, and over 71,000 jobholders in the park by the end of 2008.

Yangling Agriculture Hi-Tech Industrial Zone
Yangling Agriculture Hi-Tech Industrial Zone was approved as a national-level hi-tech development zone by State Council in 1997.

Demographics
Nearly all the people in Shaanxi are ethnic Han Chinese, with pockets of Hui population in the northwestern region (adjacent to Ningxia). Shaanxi province is one of the centers of ancient Chinese civilization. The central part of Shaanxi, known as Guanzhong, where the provincial capital Xi'an is located, is more populous compared to the others (Shaannan and Shaanbei),

Religion

The predominant religions in Shaanxi are Chinese folk religions, Taoist traditions and Chinese Buddhism. According to surveys conducted in 2007 and 2009, 7.58% of the population believes and is involved in ancestor veneration, while 1.57% of the population identifies as Christian. The reports didn't give figures for other types of religion; 90.85% of the population may be either irreligious or involved in worship of nature deities, Buddhism, Confucianism, Taoism, folk religious sects, and small minorities of Muslims.

 Catholic Church in Shaanxi
 Catholic Church in Zhifang, destroyed in 2017
 Golden Lampstand Church, destroyed in 2018

Culture

 Shaanxi cuisine
 Qinqiang, the representative folk opera of Shaanxi
 Shaanxi shadow play
 Xintianyou
 Also see Xi'an#Culture

Media
 Shaanxi Radio serves Xi'an and the surrounding Shaanxi province area with music and news.
 The Story of Yue Fei, a 17th–18th century wuxia novel about the life of Song dynasty general Yue Fei, says his military arts teacher, Zhou Tong, was from Shaanxi.

Sports
Professional sports teams based in Shaanxi include:
 Chinese Basketball Association
 Southern Division: Shaanxi Kylins
 National Basketball League (NBL): Shaanxi Wolves
 Women's Chinese Basketball Association (WCBA): Shaanxi Red Wolves
 Chinese Football Association
 China League One: Shaanxi Chang'an Athletic F.C.

See also
 List of prisons in Shaanxi
 Major national historical and cultural sites in Shaanxi

Notes

References

External links 

 
 Economic profile for Shaanxi at HKTDC

 
Provinces of the People's Republic of China
Western China